Albert Bennington Lucas (November 16, 1916June 19, 1983) was a Canadian jazz double-bassist.

Lucas took piano lessons as a child from his mother, Francis Bradley Lucas, a concert pianist, eventually switching to bass and tuba at age 12. After moving to New York City in 1933, Lucas played with Kaiser Marshall, then joined the Royal Sunset Orchestra, where he played from 1933 to 1942. During the 1940s, Lucas appeared on record with Hot Lips Page, Coleman Hawkins, Eddie Heywood (1944–45), Duke Ellington (1945), Mary Lou Williams (1946), James P. Johnson, J.J. Johnson, Ben Webster, Erroll Garner, and Eddie South.

He toured and recorded with Illinois Jacquet from 1947 to 1953, recording in Detroit with Jacquet's all-star band which included Sonny Stitt, Leo Parker, Sir Charles Thompson, Maurice Simon and Shadow Wilson before returning to play with Heywood again from 1954 to 1956. He also recorded in the 1950s with Ruby Braff, Charlie Byrd, and Teddy Wilson. He worked primarily as a studio musician in his last two decades, backing up groups at Apollo Theater performances, playing jazz only occasionally. Lucas died in New York City on June 19, 1983.

Discography

As sideman
With Charlie Byrd
Jazz Recital (Savoy, 1957)
With Bill Doggett
Everybody Dance the Honky Tonk (King, 1956)
Doggett Beat for Dancing Feet (King, 1957)
With Dexter Gordon
Landslide (Blue Note, 1962 [1980])
With Illinois Jacquet
Groovin' with Jacquet (Clef, 1951-53 [1956])
The Kid and the Brute (Clef, 1955) with Ben Webster
The King! (Prestige, 1968)
The Soul Explosion (Prestige, 1969)
With Oliver Nelson
Oliver Nelson Plays Michelle (Impulse!, 1966)
With Leo Parker
Rollin' with Leo (Blue Note, 1961)
With Sonny Stitt
Now! (Impulse, 1963)
With Teddy Wilson The Impeccable Mr. Wilson (Verve, 1956)These Tunes Remind Me of You'' (Verve, 1956 [1959])

References

1916 births
1983 deaths
Canadian jazz double-bassists
Male double-bassists
Challenge Records artists
Musicians from Windsor, Ontario
20th-century double-bassists
20th-century Canadian male musicians
Canadian male jazz musicians
Canadian emigrants to the United States